Miramichi Transit is a provider of public transportation based in Miramichi, New Brunswick, Canada. Founded in 2009, it provides 3 routes in the city. Buses run from approximately 7:00AM to 6:00PM on weekdays and 9:00AM to 4:00PM on Saturdays. Transit services are provided using small, 24 seat buses. The agency also offers charter services.

Routes
Blue Line: Newcastle to Douglastown, includes stops at Newcastle Public Library and Northumberland Square
Green Line: Chatham to Douglastown, includes a stop at Northumberland Square 
Red Line: Chatham to Newcastle, via Chatham Head, includes a stop at Miramichi Hospital and Newcastle Public Library In the summer of 2021, Miramichi Transit innovated with a Saturday Nightline, offering a single route throughout the city on Saturday evenings in July and August.

See also

 Public transport in Canada

References

External links
Miramichi Transit

Transit agencies in New Brunswick
Transport in Miramichi, New Brunswick
Bus transport in New Brunswick